Old Ephraim or Ol' Ephraim is a term popularized in the 19th-century American West to refer to grizzly bears. As well as describing the archetypal grizzly bear, the name has also been used in frontier folklore to refer to specific bears, most notably Old Ephraim (known as "Old Three Toes" by shepherds due to a deformity on one foot ). He was a very large grizzly bear that roamed the Cache National Forest in Idaho and Utah from circa 1911 until his death on August 22, 1923. He had the same name as another grizzly bear in California described in a story by P. T. Barnum.

Frank Clark and Old Ephraim
The grizzly bear from the Cache National Forest known as "Old Ephraim" was first identified by its distinctive tracks. The bear lived within a large wilderness from as far north as Soda Springs, Idaho to as far south as Weber County, Utah, before settling in Logan Canyon, about 20 miles east of Logan, Utah.

Frank Clark (born 1879 in Cherry Creek, Idaho) was a part owner of the Ward Clark Sheep Company since his arrival there in July 1911. During his first summer in the Cache National Forest, Clark counted 154 adult domestic sheep that had been killed by bears in the area.

In 1914, Frank Clark set out to stop Old Ephraim. He set many traps in Old Ephraim's favorite wallows, but the traps were always removed, un-sprung, or flung away. Although Clark seldom saw the bear, dead sheep around the herd indicated its presence. Despite Clark's efforts, Old Ephraim killed more and more sheep without being stopped. He is said to have once killed 50 sheep at a time.

Death
Though Clark had attempted to kill the bear since 1914, he did not succeed until 1923. On the night of August 21, Clark was awakened by the tremendous roars of Old Ephraim, which had been caught in a trap Clark had set earlier in a wallow just below his camp. Clark grabbed his .25-35 rifle (very small and underpowered for such a massive grizzly) and he and his dog set out down the ravine towards the wallow. Clark met the enraged massive grizzly with the huge bear trap on one of its front paws dragging the very large, heavy log which Clark had connected to the trap by a large chain Clark shot five rounds from his .25-35 carbine rifle but the bear did not go down, so Clark fled further up the ravine back towards his camp. Clark's dog harassed Old Ephraim which Clark credited to perhaps saving his life. As the bear was so near his camp, wounded and enraged, Clark spent the remainder of the night with his dog on the side of the ridge above his camp. He listened as the great bear vocalized through the night and eventually fell silent. With the first morning light Clark investigated and found the great bear laying dead near his camp. Clark described killing Old Ephraim as "the hardest of them [the bears] all". He later expressed remorse for having to do it.

Memorial
Old Ephraim was skinned and buried, but was later dug up by Boy Scout Troop 43, which sent the bear's skull to the Smithsonian. According to Clark, a pile of stones was erected by Boy Scouts over the bear's remains. Most of the remains were eventually taken by tourists as souvenirs.

Later, an  stone monument designed, lettered, and erected by Max, Arthur, and Howard Jorgensen was placed at the grave site. This memorial was officially dedicated on September 23, 1966. Affixed to the monument are two plaques, one with a poem that reads:

His skull was sent to The Smithsonian, where it was identified as a grizzly bear. It was eventually returned from the Smithsonian and put on display in the Special Collections section of the Utah State University library in Logan, Utah.

Legacy
The Old Ephraim Trail is a popular "fat tire" bike trail in the Logan area. It is a 20-mile loop with almost 3,000 feet of vertical gain, and is intended for intermediate or advanced riders.

The loop starts with several miles of moderate climbing up Cowley Canyon and proceeds uphill to the upper trailhead of Ricks Canyon. The loop circles north through aspen groves and meadows. After passing Old Ephraim's grave it descends to the Right Fork of Logan River, after which there is one more sizable climb. At the top of this climb, you can see the Mt. Naomi Wilderness and the terraced cliffs of Logan Canyon. The loop ends on the single-track Willow Creek Trail.

The Bear 100 Mile Endurance Run, starting in the Logan area and ending in Fish Haven, Idaho, is a 100-mile ultramarathon through the Wasatch and Bear River Ranges. Though considered one of the most difficult 100-mile races, it is also considered one of the most scenic, taking advantage of the fall foliage of September. Male and female overall winners receive the Old Ephraim award.

William Faulkner's 1942 short story "The Bear" has a lot of similarities to Old Ephraim.

A lifesize bronze statue of Old Ephraim stands along U.S. Route 89 (Washington Street) as it enters Montpelier, Idaho from the west. The original sculpture, installed in 2002, was replaced in 2014 by a new sculpture depicting Old Ephraim fighting against a bear trap.

In 2003, during its first deployment to Iraq from Fort Hood, Texas in support of Operation Iraqi Freedom, B Company, 16th Signal Battalion, 3rd Signal Brigade (the "Grizzlies") adopted Old Ephraim's name as its company motto to represent the same fighting spirit as the famous bear. The company presented the Old Ephraim Award annually to the soldier who best exemplified Old Ephraim's fighting spirit, as voted by the company's soldiers.

See also
 List of individual bears

References

13. "LDS Adventure Stories" 

14. Mr. Gerald Jones: Personal friend of Clark's and longtime "Old Ephraim  storyteller"

External links

"Ephraim" items in the Utah State University collection Retrieved on 9 January 2010

Individual bears
History of Idaho
History of Utah
1923 animal deaths
Individual wild animals